Lucky Bisht is a former NSG Commando in the Indian Army and he served as the Personal Security Officer of Prime Minister Narendra Modi. Bisht received the award of India's Best NSG Commando in 2009.

Early life & Military career

Lucky Bisht was born in Gangolihat in Pithoragarh district of Uttarakhand and joined the Special forces at the age of 16 in 2003. He spent two and half years in Israel for completing his special Spy and Commando training.
Lucky Bisht was also the security officer of Narendra Modi (when he was the Chief minister of Gujarat).  In 2009 he was selected as the best commando of National Security Guard. In 2022 Lucky Singh was interviewed by India's renowned crime writer and author Hussain Zaidi about his life, career  and exploits across the globe in the intelligence field as an agent for RAW Research and Analysis Wing. When United States President Barack Obama was in India for the nation tour on 8 November 2010, Bisht played a role in security detail. He has also worked with some government security agencies such as National Security Guard, Indian Army, Research and Analysis Wing, Special Forces, Assam Rifles and has led missions in various countries.

Indian film Industry
Lucky Bisht entered the Indian film industry as a writer in 2019. He also has a biopic being written about him by prolific writer Hussain Zaidi the renowned author and crime reporter.

Controversy
Bisht is the man accused in the double murder case of Uttarakhand's biggest gangsters.
On 5 September 2011, Uttarakhand Police imposed a double murder charge of Uttarakhand's biggest gangsters his companion on Lucky. He was jailed for over three years and was moved to 11 jails, and released on 11 March 2015. The Nainital district court gave him a clean chit on 6 March 2018 due to lack of evidence.
Lucky again joined the Special Forces in 2018 and retired in 2019. He started his career in Bollywood in 2019.

Filmography

See also
List of snipers

References

External links 
 
 

Living people
Indian film producers
People from Uttarakhand
1988 births
Indian male screenwriters
Army Men
Military personnel from Uttarakhand